The following is a list of Dick Tracy villain debuts.  One of the appeals of the Dick Tracy comic strip is its unique villains.  Many had bizarre deformities, including the Blank (1937), Little Face Finny (1941), Pruneface (1943), the Brow (1944), Shaky (1945), and Pearshape (1949).  Chester Gould wrote these villains for his reader's righteous condemnation, without exploring moral gray areas. This was emphasized by depicting the heroes as attractive and the villains as grotesque. Other notable villains include Big Boy (1931), Breathless Mahoney (1931) and Flattop (1943).

1930s

1940s

1950s

1960s

1970s

1980s

1990s

2000s

2010s

2020s

References

Sources
 
 
 

Dick Tracy characters
Comic strip villains
Dick Tracy
Dick Tracy